Soriano is a biographical documentary by Eduardo Montes-Bradley exploring the life and works of Osvaldo Soriano, author of Funny Dirty Little War through testimonies of friends and family in Argentina, France, Belgium, Germany, and Italy. The documentary includes rare 16mm footage filmed by Soriano and friends in his hometown of Tandil in the early 1960s. Part of this original footage was used by the director to reconstruct a short film as it was scripted by a young Osvaldo Soriano. The show film is now on the permanent collection of several university libraries.

Soriano was filmed in several locations including Milan, Rome, Paris, Linz am Rhein, Brussels, and Buenos Aires, and includes interviews with Osvaldo Bayer, Héctor Olivera, Gianni Minà, Franco Lucentini, Federico Luppi, Eduardo Galeano, Fernando Birri and others.

Soriano theatrical release was followed by the publication of a collection of testimonies in the essay “Soriano: Un Retrato” containing the entire original interviews, including the fragments that did not make it to the final cut. Soriano was later published on DVD by Noticias.

Awards and honors
 Official Selection, XIII Festival del Cinema Latino Americano. Trieste, October 1998

References

External links
 

1999 films
Argentine independent films
1990s Spanish-language films
Documentary films about writers
Films directed by Eduardo Montes-Bradley
1990s Argentine films